Grzegorz Knapp (18 March 1979 – 22 June 2014) was a Polish  speedway and ice speedway rider who rode for GTŻ Grudziądz in the Polish Speedway First League.

Death 
Grzegorz Knapp died on 22 June 2014, aged 35, after a fatal accident during a speedway race.

Ice speedway career details

World Championships 
 Individual World Championship (Ice Racing Grand Prix)
2010 - 15th placed (36 pts)

European Championships 
 Individual European Championship
 2008 -  Sanok - 13 place

See also 
 Poland national speedway team
 Speedway in Poland

References

External links 

 (pl) GTŻ Grudziądz website

Polish speedway riders
1979 births
2014 deaths
Sport deaths in Belgium
People from Wąbrzeźno
Sportspeople from Kuyavian-Pomeranian Voivodeship
Motorcycle racers who died while racing